Prioritization is the activity that arranges items or activities in order of importance relative to each other.

In the context of medical evaluation it is the establishment of the importance or the urgency of actions that are necessary to preserve the welfare of client or patient. In the clinical context, establishing priorities aids in the rationale and justification for the use of limited resources. Priority setting is influenced by time, money, and expertise. A risk priority number assessment is one way to establish priorities that may be difficult to establish in a health care setting.

Software has been designed to assist professionals in establishing priorities in a specific business setting.

See also 
Cause prioritization
Deliberative democracy
Politics
Triage
Value
Zeitgeist

References

External links 
 Priority from Wiktionary

 
Clinical data management
Clinical research
Nursing informatics
Nursing theory